Andreyevskoye is a rural locality (a selo) in Pekshinskoye Rural Settlement, Petushinsky District, Vladimir Oblast, Russia. The population was 183 as of 2010.

Geography 
Andreyevskoye is located on the left bank of the Peksha River, 29 km northeast of Petushki (the district's administrative centre) by road. Larionovo is the nearest rural locality.

References 

Rural localities in Petushinsky District